Suicide in Russia is a significant national social issue, with the suicide rate at 21.6 suicides per 100.000 people. In 2021, the suicide rate in Russia was 10.7 per 100,000 people, according to national sources, down from 39.1 in 2000 and 41.4 in 1995. Since 2002 the number of suicides has fallen in each consecutive year and has dropped to its lowest level in more than 50 years (in 1965, the number of suicides was 27,158).

History 
In the Russian Empire and for a long time in the USSR, a complete record of suicides was not kept. The studies covered individual cities or regions, later the urban population. And only since 1956 - under Nikita Khrushchev - the USSR began to collect data on suicides for the entire population of the country.
In May 1985 Mikhail Gorbachev came to power and the anti-alcohol campaign with partial prohibition began almost simultaneously. For a couple of years the number of suicides fell, but the deterioration of the socio-economic situation of the country by the end of the 1980s reversed the trend of suicides to the downside. 

The dissolution of the Soviet Union, market reforms, the First Chechen War and falling incomes among the population resulted in an increase in suicide mortality, reaching peak levels in 1994 and 1995. 

During the last years, as a consequence of the change in the culture of alcohol consumption in the country - Russians began to consume more beer, wine and other drinks with less alcohol, the decline of strong and popular vodka sales is similar to the decrease in the number of suicides in the country.

At the end of 2015, suicide rates rated as high were recorded in 37 of the 85 regions. These are, above all, the regions in the north, the Urals, Siberia and Russian Far East. The worst places were the Altai Republic, the Transbaikal, the Jewish Autonomous Oblast, Buryatia and the Nenets Autonomous Okrug, with important indigenous populations. Eighteen regions have a suicide rate classified as low, includes the two main cities of Russia: Moscow and Saint Petersburg.

Suicide rate per 100 000 population

Alcohol and suicide 

Heavy alcohol use is a significant factor in the suicide rate, with an estimated half of all suicides correlated with alcohol abuse. Russia's suicide rate has declined since the 1990s, alongside per capita alcohol consumption, despite the economic crisis since then; therefore it is believed that alcohol consumption is more of a factor than economic conditions.

See also 
 Federal law of Russian Federation no. 139-FZ of 2012-07-28, which introduced censorship of Web pages containing information about methods of suicide, and calls for suicide.

References 

Society of Russia